Saint Conon may refer to:

 Conon of Naso (1139–1236), a Basilian abbot at Naso, Sicily., 
 Conon of Perga, or Conon the gardener, a martyr saint of the Roman Empire
 Saint Conan (died 684), a bishop of the Isle of Man and an Irish missionary.